Cuthbert School was a one-room schoolhouse in Randolph County, Georgia circa 1928. By 1937, it became a high school with 12 grades, the 12th grade being optional.

Defunct schools in Georgia (U.S. state)
One-room schoolhouses in Georgia (U.S. state)
Schools in Georgia (U.S. state)
Buildings and structures in Randolph County, Georgia
Education in Randolph County, Georgia